North Macedonia is one of the twenty-four participating countries and regions competing in the Turkvision Song Contest.

History

2013
North Macedonia, then known as "the former Yugoslav Republic of Macedonia", made their debut in the Turkvision Song Contest at the 2013 contest in Eskişehir, Turkey. İkay Yusuf was internally selected to represent Macedonia in Turkey, it was originally announced that he would sing “Ağlama Benim İçin”, however it was later announced he would sing "Düşlerde Yaşamak." At the semi final of Turkvision 2013 Macedonia performed 17th but failed to qualify for the final.

2014
North Macedonia once again participated in the 2014 contest in Kazan, Tatarstan. Kaan Mazhar was internally selected as the Macedonian participant for the contest. It was announced on 27 October 2014 that Kaan would sing "Yolumu Bulurum" in Kazan., the song was officially present on 12 November 2014.

In the semi final Macedonia were drawn to perform 23rd after Romania and before Khakassia, Kaan scored a total of 181 points and finished 7th bringing Macedonia to their first final. In the final Macedonia performed 13th and finished in 14th place with 166 points.

Participation overview

See also 
 North Macedonia in the Eurovision Song Contest
 North Macedonia in the Junior Eurovision Song Contest

References 

Countries in the Turkvision Song Contest
Turkvision